Rudolf "Rudi" Gramlich (6 June 1908 – 14 March 1988) was a former SS officer, German football player and football club chairman. After the Second World War he was arrested and investigated for war crimes in Poland but was released without charge. He later was chairman of Eintracht Frankfurt during its most successful period. In 2020 the club took action to remove his posthumous titles due to his association with the Nazis.

Biography

Career
In pre-war Germany, Gramlich played for Eintracht Frankfurt. He also made 22 international appearances for Germany between 1931 and 1936, achieving third place at the 1934 World Cup in Italy. He was the captain of the German team at the 1936 Olympic Games in Berlin.

From 1939 to 1942 he was chairman of Eintracht Frankfurt.

Military service
Gramlich joined the SS in 1936. In 1942 he was stationed as an SS officer in occupied Krakow, where he also headed the football section of the SS Death's Heads Unit. In 1945 he was arrested and held by the American forces in Frankfurt in 1947, because he was suspected of having been involved in war crimes. Finally, the case against him was closed because he was exonerated by former SS personnel.

Post war
Between 1955 and 1970 Gramlich was again the chairman of Eintracht Frankfurt. In 1959 Eintracht won its only German championship and the following year reached the European Cup final, losing 7–3	to Spain's Real Madrid.

In 2020, Eintracht Frankfurt stripped Gramlich of his posthumous title of honorary president for his active participation in the Nazi Party and the SS.

References

Sources

External links
 

1908 births
1988 deaths
German footballers
Footballers from Hesse
Association football midfielders
Germany international footballers
Olympic footballers of Germany
1934 FIFA World Cup players
Footballers at the 1936 Summer Olympics
Eintracht Frankfurt players
Eintracht Frankfurt presidents
Officers Crosses of the Order of Merit of the Federal Republic of Germany
Waffen-SS personnel
Nazi Party members